Jukajärvi is a lake in the Finnish municipality of Juva located in the province of Eastern Finland. It covers an area of 9.2 km² in the Southern Savonia. The lake has the maximum length of 7 km.

In Eastern Finland there are several lakes with the same name.

References

Lakes of Juva